WKSR (1420 kHz) is an AM radio station broadcasting a classic hits format. Licensed to Pulaski, Tennessee, United States, the station is currently owned by Roger Wright through licensee Radio 7 Media, LLC, and features programming from Westwood One.

The Rocky 1420 branding was replaced by Oldies 1420 KSR as of spring 2010. On March 1, 2018, the station switched from a country music format to classic hits and adopted the branding "Classic KSR".

Previous logo

References

External links

Classic hits radio stations in the United States
KSR (AM)
Giles County, Tennessee